Millux is an unincorporated community in Kern County, California.

The name is a portmanteau derived from the agricultural concern Miller & Lux.

References

Unincorporated communities in Kern County, California
Unincorporated communities in California